Bernardo Comas Aguilera (born 14 November 1960) is a Cuban former amateur boxer in the middleweight division who won the World Amateur Championships at Munich in 1982 and was a gold medalist at the 1983 Pan American Games.

Comas, who missed the 1984 Los Angeles Olympics due to the boycott, also won gold medals at the Central American and Caribbean Games and Friendship Games.

References

1960 births
Living people
Cuban male boxers
Middleweight boxers
AIBA World Boxing Championships medalists
Pan American Games medalists in boxing
Pan American Games gold medalists for Cuba
Boxers at the 1983 Pan American Games
Central American and Caribbean Games gold medalists for Cuba
Competitors at the 1982 Central American and Caribbean Games
Central American and Caribbean Games medalists in boxing
Medalists at the 1983 Pan American Games
People from Las Tunas Province
20th-century Cuban people